Hays, Kansas is a center of media in central and northwestern Kansas. The following is a list of media outlets based in the city.

Print

Newspapers
The Hays Daily News is the city's primary newspaper, published six days a week.

Digital
 Hays Post, the most trafficked news website in northwest Kansas

Radio
The following radio stations are licensed to and/or broadcast from Hays:

AM

FM

Television
Hays is in the Wichita-Hutchinson, Kansas television market. The following television stations are licensed to and/or broadcast from Hays.

References

Mass media in Kansas
Hays, Kansas